Kazem Beyki (also Romanized as Kāz̧em Beykī ; also known as Kāz̧em Bekī and Kāz̧em Beygī) is a village in Lalehabad Rural District, Lalehabad District, Babol County, Mazandaran Province, Iran. At the 2006 census, its population was 327, in 92 families.

References 

Populated places in Babol County